A Taste of DNA is an EP by the no wave band DNA, released in 1981 through American Clavé. It was to be the band's last album to be released before they disbanded the following year.

Track listing
All songs written by DNA

Personnel
DNA
Arto Lindsay – guitar, vocals
Ikue Mori – drums
Tim Wright – bass guitar
Additional musicians and production
Mark Berry – recording
DNA – production
Vlado Meller – mastering

References

1981 debut EPs
DNA (American band) albums
No wave EPs